Antony Iannarilli (born 18 December 1990) is an Italian professional footballer who plays as a goalkeeper for Ternana.

Club career
On 15 May 2021, Iannarilli played his 100 match for Ternana Calcio, against Como 1907 for Supercoppa di Serie C.

References

External links

1990 births
Living people
People from Alatri
Italian footballers
Association football goalkeepers
Serie C players
Serie D players
S.S. Lazio players
U.S. Salernitana 1919 players
A.S. Gubbio 1910 players
F.C. Pavia players
U.S. Pistoiese 1921 players
U.S. Viterbese 1908 players
Ternana Calcio players
Footballers from Lazio
Sportspeople from the Province of Frosinone